The WWE Divas Championship was a women's professional wrestling championship in the WWE promotion. The championship was generally contested in professional wrestling matches, in which participants executed scripted finishes rather than contending in direct competition. The word "Divas" in the championship's name refers to the pseudonym WWE Diva, which WWE used to refer its female wrestlers.

The creation of the championship was announced on June 6, 2008, by then SmackDown General Manager Vickie Guerrero as a counterpart to the Raw brand's WWE Women's Championship. The inaugural champion was Michelle McCool, who defeated Natalya on July 20, 2008, at The Great American Bash. On April 13, 2009, the title was moved from SmackDown to Raw as a result of then Divas Champion Maryse being drafted to Raw in the 2009 WWE draft. On September 19, 2010, at the Night of Champions pay-per-view event, Michelle McCool (defending the Women's Championship on behalf of tag team partner and official champion, Layla) defeated Divas Champion Melina, retiring the Women's Championship and unifying it with the Divas Championship.

The title was retired on April 3, 2016, at WrestleMania 32, after Lita revealed the new WWE Women's Championship would replace the Divas Championship. Reigning champion Charlotte defeated Becky Lynch and Sasha Banks in a triple threat match at the event to become the new Women's Champion and therefore the final Divas Champion.

Overall, there were 17 different champions. Eve Torres and AJ Lee held the record for most reigns as Divas Champion with three. AJ Lee also had the longest combined reign as Divas Champion at 406 days. Nikki Bella had the longest individual title reign at 301 days, while Jillian Hall had the shortest reign at 5 minutes.

Title history

Names

Reigns

Combined reigns

See also
 Women in WWE
 List of former championships in WWE
 Women's championships in WWE

References 
 General
 
 

 Specific

External links 
 WWE.com Divas Championship Title History

WWE Diva
WWE championships lists
Women's professional wrestling championships lists